The 1951 Baylor Bears football team represented Baylor University as a member of the Southwest Conference (SWC) during the 1951 college football season. Led by second-year head coach George Sauer, the Bears compiled an overall record of 8–2–1 with a mark of 4–1–1 in conference play, placing second in the SWC. They were ranked No. 9 in the both the final AP Poll and the final Coaches Poll. Baylor was invited to the Orange Bowl, where they lost to Georgia Tech.

Four players—quarterback Larry Isbell, end Stan Williams, guard Bill Athey, and tackle Ken Casner—were recognized on the 1951 College Football All-America Team.

Schedule

References

Baylor
Baylor Bears football seasons
Baylor Bears football